Branch End is part of the village of Stocksfield in Northumberland, England. It is situated at the junction of the A695 Main Road with New Ridley Road.

Local services include a doctors' surgery, pharmacy, petrol station with associated shop and post office, two garages, a hairdresser, newsagent, children's play area and Quaker meeting house. There is a half hourly bus service to Hexham and Newcastle with Go North East "Tyne Valley 10".

Governance 
Branch End is in the parish of Stocksfield and the parliamentary constituency of Hexham.

References

Villages in Northumberland